James Walton or Jim Walton may refer to:

James Walton (MP for Preston) (1479/80–1546–50), English politician
James Walton (MP for Don Valley) (1867–1924), British politician
James Walton (inventor) (1803–1883), British inventor and industrialist
James Walton (cricketer) (1857–?), English cricketer
James B. Walton (1813–1885), veteran of the New Orleans militia unit the Washington Artillery
James G. Walton, black American Pentecostal spiritual denominational leader
Bud Walton (James Lawrence Walton, 1921–1995), younger brother of Sam Walton and cofounder of Wal-Mart
Jim Walton (born 1948), youngest son of Wal-Mart founder Sam Walton
Jim Walton (journalist) (born 1958), president of CNN Worldwide
Jim Walton (actor), American actor
Jim Walton (baseball) (born 1934), American Major League Baseball scout
Jim Walton (footballer) (1934–2013), former Australian footballer